Cirrochroa surya is an Indomalayan species of heliconiine butterfly described by Frederic Moore in 1879.

Subspecies
Cirrochroa surya surya (central to southern Burma, Mergui Archipelago)
Cirrochroa surya siamensis Fruhstorfer, 1906 (Thailand to northern Peninsular Malaysia, possibly Indo-China)

References

Vagrantini
Butterflies described in 1879